The following radio stations broadcast on FM frequency 105.3 MHz:

Argentina
 América in Paraná, Entre Ríos
 Blue in La Plata, Buenos Aires
 Del Buen Ayre in Bella Vista, Buenos Aires
 El Signo in Rosario, Santa Fe
 Espacio in Huangelén, Buenos Aires
 Estación del siglo in Rio Grande, Tierra del Fuego
 La 100 Santa Rosa in Santa Rosa, La Pampa
 La 105 in Villa María, Córdoba
 Q in Alta Gracia, Córdoba.
 Radar in Humboldt, Santa Fe.
 Región in Gálvez. Santa Fe
 Master in Miramar, Buenos Aires
 Metropolis in Formosa

Australia
 4BBB in Brisbane, Queensland
 2NEW in Newcastle, New South Wales
 ABC Radio National in Mansfield, Victoria
 Triple J in Swan Hill, Victoria
 Vision Radio Network in Portland, Victoria

Brazil
ZYD 574 in Novo Hamburgo, Rio Grande do Sul

Canada (Channel 287)
 CBU-FM-4 in Kamloops, British Columbia
 CBVP-FM in Perce, Quebec
 CBWW-FM in Dauphin/Baldy Mountain, Manitoba
 CFCA-FM in Kitchener, Ontario
 CFXY-FM in Fredericton, New Brunswick
 CHOW-FM in Amos, Quebec
 CHRD-FM in Drummondville, Quebec
 CHRM-FM in Matane, Quebec
 CISS-FM in Ottawa, Ontario
 CIXM-FM in Whitecourt, Alberta
 CJMX-FM in Sudbury, Ontario
 CJMY-FM in Clarenville, Newfoundland and Labrador
 CKMH-FM in Medicine Hat, Alberta
 CKTG-FM in Thunder Bay, Ontario
 VF2449 in Island Lake, Saskatchewan
 VF2455 in Muskeg River Mine, Alberta
 VF2550 in Pemberton, British Columbia

Cayman Islands
ZFKA-FM at Cayman Brac
ZFKZ-FM at Georgetown

China 
 CNR Music Radio in Baoding

Egypt
 Nagham FM in multiple locations

Guatemala (Channel 44) 
 TGRN-FM in Flores.

Malaysia
 8FM in Johor Bahru, Johor and Singapore
 Ai FM in Miri, Sarawak
 Johor FM in Northern Johor
 Suria in Klang Valley and Eastern Pahang
 TraXX FM in Kuantan, Pahang and Taiping, Perak

Mexico
XHBQ-FM in Guaymas, Sonora
XHCMR-FM in Cuautla, Morelos
XHE-FM in Durango, Durango
XHEMAX-FM in Tecomán, Colima
XHINFO-FM in Mexico City
XHLUPE-FM in Monterrey, Nuevo León
XHOU-FM in Huajuapan de León, Oaxaca
XHPPU-FM in Puerto Peñasco, Sonora
XHRU-FM in Chihuahua, Chihuahua
XHUZ-FM in Aguascalientes, Aguascalientes
XHZTP-FM in Zacatlán, Puebla

United States (Channel 287)
  in Marianna, Arkansas
  in Delano, California
  in Keaau, Hawaii
 KCJZ in Cambria, California
 KCMS in Edmonds, Washington
  in Comanche, Oklahoma
  in Diamondville, Wyoming
  in Chariton, Iowa
 KFBZ in Haysville, Kansas
 KGDM-LP in Merced, California
 KGRD in Orchard, Nebraska
 KHJJ-LP in Albany, Oregon
 KICI-LP in Iowa City, Iowa
 KINB in Kingfisher, Oklahoma
 KIOD in McCook, Nebraska
  in San Diego, California
 KITS in San Francisco, California
 KIWA-FM in Sheldon, Iowa
  in Levelland, Texas
  in Bixby, Oklahoma
 KJRZ-LP in Libby, Montana
 KKNI-FM in Sterling, Alaska
  in Hoxie, Arkansas
 KLIP in Monroe, Louisiana
  in Lincoln, Nebraska
 KLSR-FM in Memphis, Texas
  in Dubuque, Iowa
  in Columbus, Kansas
 KMTX in Helena, Montana
 KNCB-FM in Vivian, Louisiana
 KNOD in Harlan, Iowa
  in Kennewick, Washington
 KQOL (FM) in Sleepy Hollow, Wyoming
 KQOR in Mena, Arkansas
  in Ketchikan, Alaska
  in Shingletown, California
 KRLD-FM in Dallas, Texas
 KSLO-FM in Simmesport, Louisiana
 KSMG in Seguin, Texas
 KSWZ-LP in St. George, Kansas
 KTCY in Menard, Texas
 KTDC-LP in Muscatine, Iowa
 KTWL in Hempstead, Texas
 KXRC in Durango, Colorado
 KXXF in Crystal Beach, Texas
  in Stewartville, Minnesota
 KYMO-FM in East Prairie, Missouri
  in Rifle, Colorado
 KZLZ in Casas Adobes, Arizona
  in Rolla, Missouri
  in Minot, North Dakota
 KZTI in Fallon Station, Nevada
  in Alamogordo, New Mexico
  in Columbus Afb, Mississippi
  in Staunton, Illinois
 WBRW in Blacksburg, Virginia
  in Philadelphia, Pennsylvania
 WECB in Headland, Alabama
 WEQF-FM in Dillwyn, Virginia
  in Loudon, Tennessee
 WFPC-LP in Rindge, New Hampshire
  in Frostburg, Maryland
 WGHJ in Fair Bluff, North Carolina
  in Grand Gorge, New York
 WHTS in Coopersville, Michigan
  in Killington, Vermont
  in Evansville, Indiana
 WJYC-LP in Terryville, Connecticut
  in Knoxville, Illinois
  in Brooklyn, Michigan
  in Lafayette, Indiana
  in Hornell, New York
 WLUP in Cambridge, Minnesota
 WLVE in Mukwonago, Wisconsin
  in Scottsburg, Indiana
 WNOH in Windsor, Virginia
 WOOC-LP in Troy, New York
 WOSF in Gaffney, South Carolina
 WOUX in St. Mary's, West Virginia
  in Morrison, Tennessee
 WPHF-LP in Menomonie, Wisconsin
  in Glasgow, Kentucky
 WPTY in Calverton-Roanoke, New York
 WQCN-LP in Richmond, Virginia
 WQID-LP in Hattiesburg, Mississippi
 WRDG in Bowdon, Georgia
 WRHQ in Richmond Hill, Georgia
 WRJH-LP in Greeneville, Tennessee
 WRLN in Red Lake, Minnesota
  in Antigo, Wisconsin
 WSGC in Tignall, Georgia
  in Kittery, Maine
  in Quitman, Georgia
 WTJK in Humboldt, Tennessee
 WVBH-LP in Benton Harbor, Michigan
  in Charlotte Amalie, Virgin Islands
 WVRO-LP in Vero Beach, Florida
  in Kenner, Louisiana
  in Prestonsburg, Kentucky
 WYCY in Hawley, Pennsylvania
  in Mansfield, Ohio
 WYKB in Fernandina Beach, Florida
  in Gainesville, Florida
  in Nocatee, Florida

References 

Lists of radio stations by frequency